Acland Burghley School is a mixed comprehensive secondary school in the Tufnell Park area of the London Borough of Camden, in London, England. The school received specialist status as an Arts College in 2000 and is a part of the LaSWAP Sixth Form Consortium.

Recent quality assessments
The 2013 Ofsted report summarised the school as follows: ‘The school is larger than the average secondary school. Approximately two-fifths of students are White British. A significant proportion of students are from other White backgrounds, White and Black Caribbean and other Black backgrounds. Several other minority ethnic groups are represented in the school. An above average proportion of students are known to be eligible for the pupil premium, which provides additional funding for children in local authority care, students known to be eligible for free school meals and those from families in the armed forces. A similar proportion of students are entitled to the Year 7 catch-up premium. The proportion of students supported through school action is below average. The proportion of students supported through school action plus or with a statement of special educational needs is above average. The most common needs are behavioural, emotional and social difficulties and speech, language and communication needs. There are also students with physical disabilities. The school has specialist arts status and has gained the Arts Mark Gold Award.

The Good Schools Guide said that the school was "remarkable for its art and for the egalitarian effects of its anti-bullying and peer mentoring programme.' The school is above national average for the new Attainment 8 headline measure. The number of pupils achieving grade C or better in English and Maths is above the national average and the number of pupils attaining the English Baccalaureate is significantly above national average. The school has also twinned with Chianna Primary school from Ghana, and during the year donations are collected and sent to the school in Ghana, who are in need of basic educational supplies.

Previous headteacher Michael Shew hit out at a supply teacher for secretly filming pupils misbehaving in class. He confirmed that the school had featured on Channel 5’s hidden camera documentary Classroom Chaos after he was contacted by the Camden New Journal. The documentary, which received widespread media coverage, showed pupils misbehaving during a Media Studies class. Mr Shew argued that the programme’s makers used underhand tactics to film children without their permission and had opened up the possibility of legal action.

The current headteacher is Nicholas John. Former headteacher Jo Armitage was praised as having a significantly positive impact on the school in a 2010 Ofsted report . This was less positive in the 2013 inspection where the school was inspected and given notice to improve. A subsequent Ofsted monitoring report in September 2016 judged senior leaders and governors as "taking effective action to tackle the areas requiring improvement... in order to become a good school" and stated that "In a short space of time the new headteacher (Nicholas John) has been instrumental in delivering significant improvements." The most recent Ofsted report in March 2018 gave the school a 'Good' rating again and judged the effectiveness of leadership and management as 'Outstanding'.

LaSWAP Sixth Form
The LaSWAP Sixth Form is the sixth form consortium of four North London schools: Acland Burghley School, La Sainte Union Catholic School, Parliament Hill School and William Ellis School. It is one of the largest sixth form consortia in the Greater London area offering some 42 different A level courses, AGCEs, BTECs, NVQs and GCSE courses. The name was formed from the first three letters of La Sainte Union and the first letter of the other three schools.

Notable former staff
June Fisher was a deputy and later acting head here before she left to take up a headship and to be President of the NUT.

Notable former pupils 
 Akala, rapper, poet and journalist.
 Eddy Grant, Guyanese-British reggae musician.
 John Alford, actor who played "Robbie Wright" in the television drama series Grange Hill between 1985 and 1990.
 Kitty Daisy and Lewis, band
 Lee Thompson, musician, Madness
 Ms. Dynamite, Mercury Music Prize, two time BRIT Awards and three time MOBO Awards winning hip hop and R&B recording artist, rapper-songwriter, and record producer.
 Robert Muchamore, bestselling author of the CHERUB series of young adult novels.
 Sarah Brown, charity executive and wife of former Prime Minister Gordon Brown
 Shazad Latif, actor
 Tom Harper, director
 Jacob Bard-Rosenberg, Marxist intellectual and cultural historian
 Luke Hollman, Cricketer

Depiction in Fiction 
The exterior of the school was used as the fictional Galfast High in Steven Moffat's 1997 sitcom Chalk. The exterior was used again in 'Supernova' a 2006 story in the BBC drama series Silent Witness.

In 2008, the school was featured on the first episode of the third series of the Channel 4 show Balls of Steel.

Acland Burghley is the setting for Eve's husband's school drinks party in series 2 episode 3 of Killing Eve, with both exterior and interior footage.

In literature, the school is revealed as Peter Grant's old school in Whispers Under Ground and to have a ghost haunting the railway tracks under its playground. The science lab in Robert Muchamore's first book in the Cherub series, The Recruit, was based on the Acland Burghley science labs.

References

External links 

 
 Profile at the Good Schools Guide

Secondary schools in the London Borough of Camden
Community schools in the London Borough of Camden